The Hawaiian ladyfish (Elops hawaiensis), also known as the Hawaiian tenpounder or banana fish, is a species of ray-finned fish in the family Elopidae. It is sometimes referred to as the giant herring, though it is not closely related to the true herrings of the family Clupeidae. Its Hawaiian name is awa 'aua. It is native to the west central Pacific Ocean, and the current classification may in fact consist of several species.

Threats 

This species uses estuarine areas and hypersaline lagoons; changes in the quality of these habitats may affect this species' population dynamics.  Although this species may not be closely associated with any single habitat, it may be adversely affected by development and urbanization.

References

Elopidae
Fish of Hawaii
Fish described in 1909